Argalista rotella is a species of small sea snail with calcareous opercula, a marine gastropod mollusk in the family Colloniidae.

Distribution
This marine species is endemic to New Zealand.

References

External links
 To Biodiversity Heritage Library (1 publication)
 To World Register of Marine Species

Colloniidae
Gastropods described in 1937